Penumudi–Puligadda Bridge is located on the Krishna river on National Highway 214. It spans the river from Penumudi in Guntur district to Puligadda in Krishna district, and hence the name. The bridge became operational on 27 May 2006, and was inaugurated by the then Chief Minister YS Rajasekhara Reddy.

References

Buildings and structures in Krishna district
Roads in Krishna district
Bridges in Andhra Pradesh
Toll bridges in India
Buildings and structures in Guntur district
Transport in Guntur district
Bridges over the Krishna river